Issues of Life: Features and Remixes is a compilation album by American jazz musician and singer Gregory Porter.

Issues of Life: Features and Remixes was released after Grammy-winning Liquid Spirit (2013). The album brings together disparate tracks recorded prior to signing contract with Blue Note Records and "displays much of what has made him such a jazz superstar".

Reception 

Jazz critic John Fordham from The Guardian highlighted a "muscular, horn-heavy" version of Bobby Timmons' "Moanin'", described "Be My Monster Love" as "soulful and coolly bass-walking" and "Hope Is a Thing with Feathers" as a "smokily wondering immigant-song". He added that it was recorded with David Murray, describing him as a "post-Coltrane tenor-sax supremo".

Jazz critic Mike Hobart from Financial Times called Issues of Life: Features and Remixes a "terrific introduction to the Porter aesthetic".

Track listing

References

External links 
 

2014 albums
Gregory Porter albums